The E. W. Scripps Company is an American broadcasting company founded in 1878 as a chain of daily newspapers by Edward Willis "E. W." Scripps and his sister, Ellen Browning Scripps. It was also formerly a media conglomerate. The company is headquartered at the Scripps Center in Cincinnati, Ohio. Its corporate motto is "Give light and the people will find their own way", which is symbolized by the media empire's longtime lighthouse logo.

In terms of market reach, Scripps is the second largest operator of ABC (which is owned by The Walt Disney Company) affiliates, behind the Sinclair Broadcast Group, and ahead of Hearst Television and Tegna. Scripps also owns a number of free-to-air multi-genre digital subchannel multicast networks through its Scripps Networks subsidiary, including the Ion Television network and Scripps News.

History

19th century 
The E. W. Scripps Company was a newspaper company founded on November 2, 1878, when Edward Willis Scripps published the first issue of the Cleveland Penny Press.

In 1894, Scripps and his half-brother, George H. Scripps, organized their various papers into the first modern newspaper chain. In July 1895, it was named the Scripps-McRae League to reflect the leadership of Cincinnati Post general manager Milton A. McRae, a longtime partner. The company expanded during the decade to publish newspapers in California, Denver, Chicago, Dallas and Nashville and elsewhere.

20th century 

In early November 1922, the Scripps-McRae League was renamed Scripps-Howard Newspapers to recognize company executive Roy W. Howard. On November 23, the E. W. Scripps Company was incorporated and placed in trust for Scripps' children and grandchildren. The company's shares were divided into two types: Class A Common Shares, which were traded on the New York Stock Exchange, and common voting shares, which were not publicly traded and elected a majority of the company's directors. (A number of media companies, including the New York Times Company and the Washington Post organization, are governed by this system so that the descendants of the company's founders can keep control of the company.) E. W. Scripps died in 1926.

On June 2, 1902, Scripps founded the Newspaper Enterprise Association (NEA), based in Cleveland, Ohio, as a news report service for different Scripps-owned newspapers. It started selling content to non-Scripps owned newspapers in 1907, and by 1909, it became a more general syndicate, offering comics, pictures and features as well. It moved from Cleveland to Chicago in 1915, with an office in San Francisco. NEA rapidly grew and delivered content to 400 newspapers in 1920 and about 700 in 1930. Today, it is the oldest syndicate still in operation.

Scripps created the United Press news agency in 1907 by uniting three smaller syndicates and controlled it until a 1958 merger with William Randolph Hearst's smaller competing agency, INS, to form United Press International. With the Hearst Corporation as a minority partner, UPI continued under Scripps management until it was sold off in 1982. A separate wire service, the Scripps Howard News Service, operated for 96 years from 1917 to 2013.

United Feature Syndicate was formed in 1919 as a division of UP to distribute editorial columns, features and comic strips, and became a dominant player in the syndication market in the fall of 1931 thanks to Scripps' acquisition of the New York World, which controlled the Pulitzer company's syndication arms, Press Publishing Co. and World Feature Service. In May 1978, Scripps merged United Feature Syndicate and Newspaper Enterprise Association to form United Media Enterprises.

The company expanded its newspaper holdings throughout the pre-World War II period, acquiring many titles and merging them, including the Rocky Mountain News and Knoxville News-Sentinel. A trickle of closures and sales occurred over the next few decades. In 1966, Scripps' New York World-Telegram was merged into the New York World Journal Tribune, which closed in 1967. Papers in Indianapolis, Washington, Houston and Fort Worth were closed in the 1960s and 1970s, and the former flagship Cleveland Press was sold in 1980. Scripps also closed properties in Memphis, Columbus, Thousand Oaks and El Paso throughout the 1980s and 1990s, while selling the Pittsburgh Press in 1992.

In 1985, the company went into home video foray with its acquisition of Kartes Video Communications in an effort to expand the marketplace. Two years later, Scripps Howard sold off Kartes Video Communications back to its founders, after an aborted deal where Scripps-Howard's acquisition of Hanes failed.

In 1997, Scripps bought daily newspapers in the Texas cities of Abilene, Wichita Falls, San Angelo and Plano, plus the paper in Anderson, South Carolina, from Harte-Hanks Communications, along with 25 non-daily newspapers and San Antonio-based KENS-TV and KENS-AM. The purchase price was to be between $605 and $775 million, depending on a federal ruling. (Scripps eventually spun off all of its newspapers into Journal Media Group in 2015.)

Scripps made its first foray into broadcasting in 1935, forming a company called Continental Radio and buying radio stations WCPO in Cincinnati and WNOX in Knoxville. After the war, In 1947, Scripps opened its first television station, Cleveland-based WEWS-TV, with Memphis-based WMC-TV and Cincinnati-based WCPO-TV in subsequent years.  It now owns dozens of TV and radio stations. In the 1980s and 1990s, Scripps became a cable television provider and also developed programming for cable, notably SportSouth (currently Bally Sports South) in 1990 (in a joint venture with Turner Broadcasting and TCI), Food Network in 1993 and HGTV in 1994. (Scripps spun off its cable properties into Scripps Network Interactive in 2008.)

The company went public with an IPO in 1988. It owned 20 daily newspapers and 9 television stations at the time, with and cable systems in 10 states. The company completed a new downtown Cincinnati headquarters, the 35-story high-rise Scripps Center, in 1990.

21st century 
In October 2007, Scripps announced that it would separate into two publicly traded companies: The E. W. Scripps Company (newspapers, TV stations, licensing/syndication) and Scripps Networks Interactive (HGTV, Food Network, DIY Network, Cooking Channel (formerly known as Fine Living), Travel Channel and Great American Country). The transaction was completed on July 1, 2008.

After a test launch at WFTS-TV in 2009, Scripps television stations launched YouTube channels in 2010. These are similar to YouTube channels operated by Hearst Television and LIN Television.

On February 24, 2011, United Media struck a distribution deal with Universal Uclick (now known as Andrews McMeel Syndication) for syndication of the company's 150 comic strip and news features, which became effective on June 1 of that year. At that point, United Media, and by extension the Scripps Company, exited the syndication business.

On September 12, 2011, Scripps partnered with Cox Media Group and Raycom Media to launch Right This Minute, a viral video program. On the same day, Scripps launched The List, a news magazine. Both were part of an approach for "homegrown" programming—programming created by Scripps. Raycom also launched America Now on the same day. The creator of RTM and The List applied this "homegrown" programming approach to Tegna in 2015, with the launch of T.D. Jakes. Scripps launched Let's Ask America in 2013 (now cancelled), partnering with Telepictures to do so, and Pickler and Ben in 2017.

On October 3, 2011, Scripps announced it was purchasing the television arm of McGraw-Hill for $212 million. This purchase nearly doubled the number of Scripps stations to 19 with a combined reach of 13% of U.S. households. Upon the 2012 death of E. W. Scripps' grandson, Robert Scripps, the Edward W. Scripps Trust was dissolved and its stock divided among the surviving trustees.

In December 2013, Scripps purchased Newsy for $35 Million.

On July 30, 2014, Scripps and Journal Communications announced that the two companies would merge and spin-off their newspaper assets. The deal created a broadcast group under the E. W. Scripps Company name and retaining the Cincinnati headquarters, and a newspaper company based in Milwaukee, Wisconsin, under the Journal Media Group name. The FCC approved the deal on December 12, 2014, and it was approved by shareholders on March 11, 2015. The merger and spinoff were completed on April 1, 2015. In turn, Journal Media Group was acquired by Gannett Company on April 8, 2016. Gannett had also shed their television and broadcast operations into a spin-off, Tegna, months after the Scripps-Journal merger.

In April 2016, Demand Media announced the sale of the humor/listicle website Cracked.com to E. W. Scripps. In June, it acquired podcast service Stitcher from Deezer.

On August 1, 2017, Scripps announced the purchase of Katz Broadcasting and its three networks plus Bounce which Katz operates, for $292 million, acquiring the other 95% of the company. The purchase was completed on October 2, 2017. On May 22, 2018, Scripps announced that it was changing its common stock listing from the New York Stock Exchange to Nasdaq, which occurred on June 4, 2018.

Scripps newspapers

Syndicates
 United Media (1978–2011), consisted of:
 United Feature Syndicate (est. 1919) – syndicated many notable comic strips, including Peanuts, Garfield, Li'l Abner, Dilbert, Nancy and Marmaduke
 Newspaper Enterprise Association (est. 1902) – originally a secondary news service to the Scripps Howard News Service, later evolved into a general syndicate; best known for syndicating Alley Oop, Freckles and His Friends, The Born Loser and Frank and Ernest, in addition to an annual Christmas comic strip

The distribution rights to properties syndicated by United Media were outsourced to Universal Uclick in February 2011. While United Media effectively ceased to exist, Scripps still maintains copyrights and intellectual property rights.

Scripps also operated United Press International (United Press from its 1907 inception until a 1958 merger with Hearst's International News Service) until selling it off in 1982.

Broadcasting

Scripps' broadcast television stations division—also commonly known as Scripps Media or Scripps Howard Broadcasting, formerly Continental Radio, currently owns or operates 62 television stations in forty-three markets, with full-power and low-power stations as well as rebroadcaster, translator, repeater and satellite stations included. Among them, nineteen ABC affiliates, twelve CBS affiliates, eleven NBC affiliates, six Fox affiliates, four CW affiliates, two MyNetworkTV affiliates, three specialty network affiliated stations and one station independent of any network affiliation.

History

1935–1947: Early history, radio era
The company was formed in 1935 when Scripps Howard made its foray into broadcasting by bought out radio station WDBZ, renaming it WCPO after newspaper The Cincinnati Post.

Later on, Scripps purchased radio station, WNOX from the Sterchi Brothers furniture chain. In 1936, The Commercial Appeal was purchased by the Scripps Howard newspaper chain, which included the WMC stations. In 1937, the Memphis Press-Scimitar bought out WGBC from First Baptist Church of Memphis in 1937 and changed the letters to WMPS.

1947–1977: The television era
In 1947, Scripps expanded its broadcast holdings by opening its first television station, Cleveland-based WEWS-TV. This was followed in 1948 by Memphis-based WMC-TV and Cincinnati-based WCPO-TV in 1949.

The company expanded its television holdings in 1961 by purchasing West Palm Beach station WPTV-TV from the Phipps family. It was followed nearly nine years later by its purchase of its Tulsa station KVOO-TV from Central Plains Enterprises. The sale received FCC approval on November 25, 1970, and was finalized the following month on December 31. On January 1, 1971, the day after the Scripps purchase was completed, the station changed its call letters to KTEW-TV (standing for "Tulsa E.W. Scripps", and also easily interpreted as sounding like the phoneticism for "two"). This change was made due to an FCC rule in effect at the time that banned TV and radio stations in the same market, but with different owners from sharing the same call letters.

By 1963, the company has taken on its familiar name Scripps-Howard Broadcasting Company, and made it public.

1977–1994: The independent expansion
In 1977, the company expanded its focus onto independent station territory by purchasing KBMA-TV in Kansas City from the Businessmen's Assurance Company of America, but in 1981 the station was renamed to KSHB-TV. Nearly seven years later, in 1984, after Edwin Copperstein rebuffed a bid from Tribune Company, Scripps immediately purchased independent station, KNXV-TV in Phoenix. To make room for the sale, Scripps was required to divest itself of radio stations KMEO-AM-FM.

Nearly one year later, Scripps purchased ABC station, WXYZ-TV in Detroit, and independent station WFTS-TV in Tampa Bay from Capital Cities Communications as part of a spin-off reorganization, after the FCC felt that the combination of Cap Cities and ABC exceeded the new ownership limit of 12 stations and the 25% national reach limit. On October 9, 1986, two of Scripps' stations in Phoenix and Kansas City became affiliates of the Fox Broadcasting Company television network. A third independent station in Tampa Bay joined Fox in 1988 after WTOG-TV disaffiliated from the network.

In 1988, the broadcasting division of the company started its own production company Scripps Howard Productions in order to produce and market television programs.

From 1990 to 1995, Scripps was a partner in the regional sports network SportSouth, along with Turner Broadcasting and Tele-Communications, Inc.; in 1996 the network was sold to News Corporation and became Fox Sports South.

In the summer of 1990, Scripps bought out the NBC Baltimore affiliate WMAR-TV from Gillett Communications, but in February 1991 the transfer was canceled after Scripps accused Gillett of misreporting WMAR's financial statements. Gillett then took legal action against Scripps, but both sides settled and the sale went forward. Scripps took control of the station in the spring of 1991.

On July 19, 1993, Scripps sold WMC-AM-FM-TV to Atlanta businessman Bert Ellis and his new company, Ellis Communications.

In 1994, Scripps acquired the Knoxville-based Cinetel Productions to serve as a production base for a new home lifestyle-oriented cable network, which would eventually launch in December as HGTV. Scripps later acquired a stake in the Food Network, and launched a spin-off of HGTV known as DIY Network.

1994–2000: The repercussions of the realignment and deals with ABC and NBC

Within a year-long span during 1994–95, a series of surprising events occurred which not only changed the look of the television industry, but also Scripps' various television stations.

In 1994, the Fox Broadcasting Company agreed to a multi-year, multi-station affiliation deal with New World Communications, resulting in most of New World's stations switching to Fox. Some of these stations were longtime CBS affiliates KSAZ-TV in Phoenix and WTVT-TV in Tampa/St. Petersburg, and NBC station WDAF-TV in Kansas City, which would displace all three of Scripps' stations affiliated with Fox, KNXV-TV in Phoenix, WFTS-TV in Tampa and KSHB-TV in Kansas City. Around that time, it was switched, two Scripps markets in Detroit and Cleveland were courted to affiliate to CBS, but turned down the offer.

The loss of Fox affiliates in these three markets did not sit well with Scripps-Howard, looking for a group agreement. Scripps-Howard Broadcasting was involved in three of the broadcast television switches that was resulted from the 1994–1996 United States broadcast television realignment. At first, on June 16, 1994, Scripps-Howard renewed its affiliation agreement with ABC for its stations WEWS (channel 5), in Cleveland, Ohio and WXYZ-TV (channel 7) in Detroit (both of these outlets were wooed by CBS, which was about to lose its longtime affiliates in Cleveland and Detroit to Fox via a deal with New World Communications), and signed an agreement to affiliate NBC affiliate WMAR-TV (channel 2) in Baltimore, and two displaced Fox stations from the New World deal, KNXV-TV (channel 15) in Phoenix and WFTS-TV (channel 28) in Tampa/St. Petersburg with ABC, which would displace 3 VHF stations WJZ-TV (channel 13) in Baltimore (which ended up being a CBS affiliate through a deal with Group W), KTVK (channel 3) in Phoenix (which ended up being an independent station) and WTSP-TV (channel 10) in Tampa/St. Petersburg (which also ended up being a CBS affiliate). The second deal occurred on July 25, 1994, when Scripps agreed to renew its existing affiliation agreements with NBC for its stations KJRH-TV (channel 2) in Tulsa, Oklahoma and WPTV-TV (channel 5) in West Palm Beach, Florida, while signing an agreement to affiliate a Fox affiliate displaced in the New World deal, KSHB-TV (channel 41) in Kansas City with NBC, picking it up from WDAF-TV (channel 4) in Kansas City, which was slated to switch from NBC to Fox. The third and final agreement that resulted from the realignment occurred in September 1995, when Scripps agreed to affiliate CBS affiliate WCPO-TV (channel 9) in Cincinnati with ABC, displacing WKRC-TV (channel 12) in Cincinnati, which effectively reversed the 1961 affiliation swap that WKRC became a CBS affiliate again.

In October 1995, Comcast announced the purchase of Scripps' cable provider operation.

In 1997, Scripps bought daily newspapers in the Texas cities of Abilene, Wichita Falls, San Angelo and Plano, plus the paper in Anderson, S.C. from Harte-Hanks Communications, along with 25 non-daily newspapers and San Antonio-based KENS-TV and KENS-AM. The purchase price was to be between $605 and $775 million, depending on a federal ruling. (Scripps eventually spun off all of its newspapers into Journal Media Group in 2015.)

In March 1996, KSHB owner Scripps Howard Broadcasting reached a deal to manage KMCI under a local marketing agreement. That August, KMCI then dropped much of its home shopping programming and rebranded as "38 Family Greats", with a family-oriented general entertainment format from 6:00 a.m. to midnight, with HSN programming being relegated to the overnight hours. The new KMCI lineup included an inventory of programs that KSHB owned but had not had time to air after it switched to NBC in 1994.

Exercising an option from the 1996 pact with Miller, Scripps bought KMCI outright for $14.6 million in 2000, forming a legal duopoly with KSHB. In 1998, the company sold Scripps Howard Productions, and Cinetel Productions was renamed to Scripps Productions.

2000–2008: The Shop at Home era
Scripps also previously owned the Shop at Home Network from 2000 until 2006. Shop at Home in turn owned five television stations, all as a division of its cable network division managed separately from the company's traditional commercial network affiliate stations.

Attempts to use Shop at Home as a complementary service to Food Network and HGTV by selling products connected to personalities of those networks were middling compared to competitors QVC and HSN. On May 22, 2006, Scripps announced that it was to cease operations of the network and intended to sell each of Shop at Home's five owned and operated television stations. Jewelry Television eventually acquired Shop at Home, but Scripps still intended to sell its affiliated stations (Jewelry Television discontinued most Shop at Home operations in March 2008). On September 26, 2006, Scripps announced that it was selling its Shop at Home TV stations to New York City-based Multicultural Television for $170 million.

2008–present: Scripps today

In October 2007, Scripps announced that it would separate into two publicly traded companies: The E. W. Scripps Company (newspapers, TV stations, licensing/syndication) and Scripps Networks Interactive (Cooking Channel (formerly known as Fine Living), DIY Network, Food Network, Great American Country, HGTV, and Travel Channel). The transaction was completed on July 1, 2008.

After a test launch at WFTS-TV in 2009, Scripps television stations launched YouTube channels in 2010. These are similar to YouTube channels operated by Hearst Television and LIN Television.

Scripps was the recipient of the 2012 National Association of Broadcasters Distinguished Service Award.

On October 3, 2011, Scripps announced it was purchasing all seven television stations owned by The McGraw-Hill Companies for $212 million; the sale is a result of McGraw-Hill's decision to exit the broadcasting industry to focus on its other core properties, including its publishing unit. This deal was approved by the FTC on October 31 and the FCC on November 29. The deal was completed on December 30, 2011.

On February 10, 2014, Scripps announced it has reached a deal to acquire Buffalo ABC affiliate WKBW-TV and Detroit MyNetworkTV affiliate WMYD for $110 million. The sale was approved by the FCC on May 2, 2014, and was completed on June 16, 2014. This deal has created a duopoly between WMYD and ABC affiliate WXYZ-TV.

On July 30, 2014, Scripps and Journal Communications announced that the two companies would merge and spin-off their newspaper assets. The deal created a broadcast group under the E. W. Scripps Company name and retaining the Cincinnati headquarters, and a newspaper company based in Milwaukee, Wisconsin, under the Journal Media Group name. The FCC approved the deal on December 12, 2014, and it was approved by shareholders on March 11, 2015. The merger and spinoff were completed on April 1, 2015. In turn, Journal Media Group was acquired by Gannett Company on April 8, 2016. Gannett had also shed their television and broadcast operations into a spin-off, Tegna, months after the Scripps-Journal merger.

On January 25, 2018, it was announced that Scripps had placed its radio station unit for sale. The divestiture of these stations – which were acquired through the company's 2015 acquisition of Journal Communications – would result in the separation of Scripps's television stations in Tulsa, Omaha, Milwaukee, Boise and Tucson from their co-owned radio clusters (in the case of Tulsa, KJRH-TV would be separated from KFAQ for the second time; the two stations, then using the shared KVOO callsign, were first split up in 1970, when Central Plains Enterprises sold the then-KVOO-TV to Scripps). In June 2018, Griffin Communications reached a deal to buy the Scripps Tulsa radio cluster. The sale was completed on July 28, 2018. In July 2018, Good Karma Brands reached a deal to buy the Scripps Milwaukee radio cluster. The sale was completed on November 1, 2018.

On August 20, 2018, Scripps agreed to purchase ABC affiliates KXXV in Waco, Texas and satellite station KRHD-CD in Bryan, Texas and WTXL-TV in Tallahassee, Florida, which are being spun off from the Gray Television-Raycom Media merger in order to alleviate ownership conflicts involving Gray's ownership of CBS affiliate KWTX-TV and its semi-satellite KBTX-TV in the Waco market and CBS affiliate WCTV and Retro Television Network affiliate WFXU in the Tallahassee market.

On October 29, 2018, Cordillera Communications announced that it would sell all but one of its television stations to Scripps. KVOA in Tucson, Arizona is not included in the deal as Scripps already owns KGUN-TV and KWBA in that market, and Cordillera will concurrently sell KVOA to Quincy Media. The FCC approved the sale on April 5, 2019, and the sale was completed on May 1.

On March 20, 2019, Scripps announced that it would acquire eight of the 21 (initially 19) stations being divested as part of Nexstar Media Group's $580 million (USD) acquisition of Tribune Media. The Tribune stations include CBS affiliates WTKR in Norfolk and WTVR-TV in Richmond—both in Virginia, along with Fox affiliates KSTU in Salt Lake City, Utah and WXMI in Grand Rapids, Michigan and CW affiliates WPIX in New York City, WGNT in Norfolk, Virginia and WSFL-TV in Miami, Florida. The only Nexstar station being acquired is CW affiliate KASW in Phoenix, Arizona—which would create a duopoly with longtime Scripps-owned ABC affiliate KNXV-TV. Also, Nexstar has the option to buy WPIX back between March 31, 2020, and December 31, 2021. The FCC approved the sale on September 16 with all of the transactions being completed on September 19.

In July 2020, the company sold their Stitcher podcast service and assets to Sirius XM for $325 million.

On September 22, 2020, the company announced it was buying KCDO-TV and KSBS-CD from Newsweb Corporation for $9.5 million, pending approval of the Federal Communications Commission (FCC); this would make them sister stations to ABC affiliate KMGH-TV (channel 7). For the time being, KCDO has moved Grit to its primary 3.1 subchannel. The sale was completed on November 20.

On September 24, 2020, Scripps announced the acquisition of American media company Ion Media, including its networks, Ion Television, Ion Plus, and Qubo for $2.65 billion.

Scripps finally completed its sale of WPIX to Mission Broadcasting on December 30, 2020, which will also allow the company to keep three of the Ion stations that were slated to be sold to a new company, Inyo Broadcast Holdings. The sales of WPPX-TV in Philadelphia, KKPX-TV in San Francisco and KPXM-TV in Minneapolis-St. Paul, Minnesota were contingent on whether or not the sale of WPIX would close and be finalized before Scripps completed its acquisition of Ion Media.

In late 2022, Scripps created an in-house sports division with the intent of offering its local stations or Ion to teams and leagues as an alternative to the fledgling regional sports network.

Television stations
Stations are arranged alphabetically by state and by city of license.
 (**) indicates a station that was built and signed-on by Scripps.

Former stations

Television

Radio 
 (**) indicates a station that was built and signed-on by Scripps.

National Spelling Bee 

Scripps also operates the national (US) spelling bee. The final competition is in Washington, DC, and it is broadcast on Ion Television and Bounce TV. Lower levels are organized by the school, then county and eventually to the final competition.

Notes

License ownership/operational agreements

Mergers and acquisitions

Satellites and semi-satellites

See also
 Edward W. Scripps
 Ellen Browning Scripps
 James E. Scripps
 Charles Scripps
 Scripps Howard Foundation
 Scripps Ranch
 Edward W. Estlow
 Scripps Networks Interactive

References

Sources

External links

 

 
Companies listed on the Nasdaq
Mass media companies of the United States
Mass media companies established in 1878
Publishing companies established in 1878
American companies established in 1878
Newspaper companies of the United States
Television broadcasting companies of the United States
Scripps
1878 establishments in Ohio
1980s initial public offerings
Radio broadcasting companies of the United States